Worthington Christian School is a private Christian school in Worthington, Franklin County, Ohio, United States.  The school was founded in 1973, and teaches grades kindergarten through twelve.

As suggested by the name, the school teaches Christian beliefs as a required part of its curriculum.

According to the school, 95% of graduates go on to a subsequent four-year degree program.

Organization
Worthington Christian School, which in turn, is a ministry of the Grace Polaris Church of Columbus, Ohio; a member of the Fellowship of Grace Brethren Churches.  The school's statement of faith comes from the fellowship, a voluntary organization of autonomous churches.  Students come from a variety of different Christian churches, and are required to share core beliefs, but not necessarily belong to the same denomination. Worthington Christian School is private school with strong Christian values and a foundation in Christ-centered teaching. In addition to rigorous academics and a chance to participate in co-curricular activities, they supplement the truth your child hears at home and church by integrating biblical truth into everything they do. They offer K-12 programs to ensure academic growth at any level. In addition, they offer a wide range of academic, arts, athletic programming.

Notable alumni

This is a selective list of both graduates, and others who attended the school.
 Maggie Grace – Television and movie actress, she attended Worthington Christian Schools from Kindergarten to grade nine (grade nine being the only one at the high school).  At the time she was at the school, her name was Margaret Grace Denig. She has shared about her experience while being interviewed by Conan O'Brien.
 Tyler Joseph – Singer/songwriter, co-founder and lead singer of the alternative duo Twenty One Pilots. Their 4th studio album Blurryface reached number 1 on the Billboard Hot 100.
 Joy Morrissey – Member of the United Kingdom Parliament.

Sports
Fall: golf, soccer, volleyball, tennis, cross country, football
Winter: basketball, bowling, cheerleading, swimming, diving
Spring: baseball, softball, tennis, track

Ohio High School Athletic Association team state championships 

 Boys' Basketball - 1999
 Boys' Golf - 2017
 Boys' Soccer - 2006, 2009, 2011

References

External links
Official website

Christian schools in Ohio
Educational institutions established in 1973
High schools in Franklin County, Ohio
Worthington, Ohio
Private high schools in Ohio
1973 establishments in Ohio